Mountain Goat is a bus operator and travel company based in Windermere in the Lake District, England.

History
Mountain Goat was established in 1972 operating minibus tours to the more remote parts of the Lake District. In 2014, the company won a tender to develop the main tourist centre in Windermere from South Lakeland District Council, spending £150,000 on redevelopment. The company supports the use of the local workforce to run the centre in order to make visitors more welcome.

Services
The company runs a service for foot passengers crossing the lake from Bowness-on-Windermere to Hill Top. This is route number 525, and runs between Ferry House and Hawkshead. You can also take the 525 from Hawkshead, where it does a round loop via Wray Castle.

References

External links
Company website

Bus operators in Cumbria
Lake District
Transport in Cumbria